Omiodes maculicostalis is a species of moth in the family Crambidae described by George Hampson in 1893 from Srilanka.It is present in Srilanka and India.

Description
size 24mm. "Smoky black with a slight purple tinge; palpi below, thorax, and legs white. Fore wing with curved antemedial line; a post- medial white spot on costa; both wings with discocellular black spot and a postmedial line sinuous from costa to vein 2, then retracted to below end of cell, and on hind wing oblique to near anal angle; cilin tipped with white towards outer angle of fore wing and anal angle of hind wing. Underside greyish."

References

Omiodes
Moths described in 1893